Éva Molnár (born 25 May 1958) is a Hungarian rower. She competed in the women's coxless pair event at the 1980 Summer Olympics.

References

External links 
  (1979 World Rowing Championships)
  (1973 European Championships)
 
 
 

1958 births
Living people
Hungarian female rowers
Olympic rowers of Hungary
Rowers at the 1980 Summer Olympics
Rowers from Budapest